MV Chief Seattle is a fireboat named for Chief Seattle operated by the Seattle Fire Department (SFD). Chief Seattle was built in 1984 and commissioned the following year.

The ship was refurbished and refitted in 2013 with the aim of extending its service life until 2033. Chief Seattle is regularly docked at Fishermen's Terminal where it serves as Seattle's primary freshwater firefighting vehicle.

References

Fireboats in Seattle, Washington
1984 ships